Saint-Georges Aerodrome  is a general aviation aerodrome located  west-southwest of Saint-Georges, Quebec, Canada, near the border with Maine. The airport has a long, paved runway, suitable for use by jets.

The airport is classified as an airport of entry by Nav Canada and is staffed by the Canada Border Services Agency (CBSA). CBSA officers at this airport can handle general aviation aircraft only, with no more than 15 passengers.

References

Saint-Georges, Quebec
Registered aerodromes in Chaudière-Appalaches